(born October 22, 1973, stylized as Taku Hirano) is a Japanese percussionist and recording artist. He has performed as a solo artist and as one half of the duo Tao Of Sound. He has toured with Fleetwood Mac and Whitney Houston as a percussionist.

Biography
Takuya "Taku" Hirano was born in Osaka, and grew up in Fresno, California and Hong Kong. He attended Hong Kong International School and graduated from Roosevelt School of the Arts at Theodore Roosevelt High School (Fresno), where he studied orchestral percussion, jazz, Afro-Cuban jazz, and salsa music. He then attended Berklee College of Music, studying under Giovanni Hidalgo and Jamey Haddad, graduating in 1995 with a Bachelor of Music as the college's first Hand Percussion principal. He has also studied drum set with Alan Dawson and Leon "Ndugu" Chancler, as well as in Havana, Cuba with Changuito.

As a percussionist, Hirano has toured with Fleetwood Mac, Whitney Houston, Bette Midler, Stevie Nicks, Lionel Richie, Isaac Hayes, Dr. John, Lindsey Buckingham, John Mayer, A.R. Rahman, Hikaru Utada, and with Cirque du Soleil on Michael Jackson: The Immortal World Tour.

Hirano has recorded with Dr. Dre on 2001, Fleetwood Mac, Whitney Houston, The Temptations, Hikaru Utada, Stevie Nicks, LeAnn Rimes, Josh Groban, Chromeo, Ziggy Marley, Emmanuel Jal, Nelly Furtado and Lionel Richie, in addition to working on major motion picture soundtracks.

As co-founder of the production duo Tao Of Sound, he has worked as a producer and programmer of commercial sound libraries, and remixer for artists such as Kanye West, Kitaro, and The Ahn Trio. Tao of Sound has released four albums under the record label Domo Records: Metro (2010)  Ronin- Extended Play (2012), Ronin (2013), and These Times (2016).

Hirano is a columnist for Drum! magazine, a contributor for Modern Drummer magazine a drum clinician, and has served as an artist-in-residence at Carnegie Mellon University, as a teacher at the Thelonious Monk Institute of Jazz, and as a guest lecturer at Loyola University New Orleans College of Music and Fine Arts and New York University Steinhardt. He is a regular visiting artist at Hugh Hodgson School of Music at University of Georgia, and an ongoing regular guest artist, speaker and panelist at his alma mater, Berklee College of Music.

Hirano was listed in Modern Drummer 's Reader's Poll 2014, 2013, and 2012, and Drum!'''s Drummies awards 2015 Percussionist of the Year (runner up), 2015 Rock/Pop/Hip-Hop Percussionist (runner-up), 2013 Studio Percussionist (runner-up), 2013 Rock/Pop/Hip-Hop Percussionist (runner-up), 2012 Studio Percussionist (runner-up), 2012 World Percussionist (runner-up), 2011 Percussionist of the Year (runner-up), 2011 Studio Percussionist (runner-up), 2011 Jazz/Fusion Percussionist (runner-up), 2011 Live Performer (runner-up), 2011 Rock/Pop Percussionist of the Year (runner-up), 2010 Rock/Pop Percussionist of the Year, 2009 Rock/Pop Percussionist of the Year, 2008 Percussionist of the Year (runner-up), 2008 Best Worldbeat Percussionist (runner-up), and 2007 Percussion Rising Star.

In 2018 and 2019, Hirano toured with Fleetwood Mac on their An Evening with Fleetwood Mac World Tour. He also served as the percussionist in the house bands for the Fox television shows Showtime at the Apollo and The Four: Battle for Stardom.

Hirano endorses Meinl percussion instruments, Zildjian cymbals, Remo drum heads, Vater Percussion drum sticks, Drum Workshop drums and hardware, and Roland Corporation electronic percussion.

On July 16, 2021 Hirano released his debut single on Ropeadope Records, "Come And Get It" featuring jazz trumpeter Keyon Harrold. On October 1, 2021, Hirano released his debut album "Blu York - Live in NYC" on Ropeadope Records, recorded live at the Nublu Club in New York City in 2020.

Awards
 ORIGIN Magazine – 100 Top Creatives (2015)
 Modern Drummer Magazine Reader's Poll 2015 – Best Percussionist (Runner-up)
 Modern Drummer Magazine Reader's Poll 2013 – Best Percussionist (Runner-up)
 Modern Drummer Magazine Reader's Poll 2012 – Best Percussionist (Runner-up)
 Drum! Magazine Drummies 2015 – Percussionist of the Year (Runner-up); Rock/Pop/Hip-Hop Percussionist (Runner-up)
 Drum! Magazine Drummies 2013 – Studio Percussionist (Runner-up); Rock/Pop/Hip-Hop Percussionist (Runner-up)
 Drum! Magazine Drummies 2012 – Studio Percussionist (Runner-up); World Percussionist (Runner-up)
 Drum! Magazine Drummies 2011 – Percussionist of the Year (Runner-up); Studio Percussionist (Runner-up); Jazz/Fusion Percussionist (Runner-up); Live Performer (Runner-up); Rock/Pop Percussionist of the Year (Runner-up)
 Drum! Magazine Drummies 2010 – Rock/Pop Percussionist of the Year
 Drum! Magazine Drummies 2009 – Rock/Pop Percussionist of the Year
 Drum! Magazine Drummies 2008 – Percussionist of the Year (Runner-up); Worldbeat Percussionist (Runner-up)
 Drum! Magazine Drummies 2007 – Percussion Rising Star of the Year; Rock/Pop Percussionist (Runner-up)
 Louis Armstrong award
 Musikmesse Frankfurt International Press Awards (M.I.P.A.) 2010 – Best Percussion Instrument Design: Meinl Percussion Taku Hirano Signature Handbale

Discography

As leader
 Blu York - Live in NYC (Ropeadope Records / Modern Icon Recordings 2021)
 Come And Get It (feat. Keyon Harrold) - single release (Ropeadope Records / Modern Icon Recordings 2021)

With Tao Of Sound
 These Times (Domo Records 2016)
 Ronin (Domo Records 2013)
 Ronin- Extended Play (Domo Records 2012)
 Metro (Domo Records 2010)

Other artists/projects
 LeAnn Rimes – God's Work (2022)
 Killing Me Softly With His Songs (Documentary Film Score/On-camera) (2022)
 The Masked Singer - The Masked Singer (American season 8) (2022)
 Lionel Richie – Renaissance Deluxe Edition (2021)
 Dumpstaphunk – Where Do We Go From Here (2021)
 Julius Rodriguez – Midnight Sun (2021)
 The Masked Singer - The Masked Singer (American season 5) (2021)
 LeAnn Rimes – Chant: The Human & the Holy (2020)
 Gorden Campbell – Conversations (2020)
 Mike Phillips – Pulling Off The Covers (2020)
 Will Downing – Romantique, Pt. 1  (2019)
 The Bronx, USA (HBO Documentary Film Score/On-camera) (2019)
 Lindsey Buckingham – Solo Anthology: The Best of Lindsey Buckingham (2018)
 iZombie (TV series) – Season 3 (2017)
 Naveen Kumar – Silence Is Bliss (2015)
 Jessy J – My One and Only One (2015)
 Ziggy Marley – Fly Rasta (2014)
 Chromeo – White Women (2014)
 Hikaru Utada – Utada: In the Flesh 2010 (Concert DVD/Live Album) (2013)
 Dino Soldo – Human (2012)
 Josh Groban – iTunes Live from SoHo (2010)
 American Idol – American Idol (season 8) (2009)
 James Day - Natural Things (2009)
 Lindsey Buckingham – Live at the Bass Performance Hall (Concert DVD/Live Album) (2008)
 Ahn Trio – Lullaby For My Favorite Insomniac (2008)
 Emmanuel Jal – Warchild (2008)
 La Corona (film) (Documentary Film Score) (2008)
 Stevie Nicks – Crystal Visions... The Very Best of Stevie Nicks ("Landslide" and "Edge of Seventeen" live with the Melbourne Symphony Orchestra) (2007)
 Random House of Soul – Random House of Soul (2007)
 Nelly Furtado – Loose (2006)
 Hikaru Utada – Utada United 2006 (Concert DVD/Live Album) (2006)
 Lindsey Buckingham – Soundstage Presents Lindsey Buckingham (Concert DVD/Live Album) (2005)
 Fleetwood Mac – Fleetwood Mac: Live in Boston (Concert DVD/Live Album) (2004)
  Fleetwood Mac – Fleetwood Mac: Destiny Rules (Documentary) (2004)
 Lionel Richie – Encore (2004)
 Lionel Richie – Just for You (2004)
 Hikaru Utada – Utada Hikaru in Budokan 2004: Hikaru no 5 (ヒカルの5, "Hikaru's 5") (Concert DVD/Live Album) (2004)
 Fleetwood Mac – Say You Will Limited Edition (Peacekeeper (Fleetwood Mac song) live from AOL Sessions; Say You Will (Fleetwood Mac song) live from AOL Sessions) (2003)
 Jay Z – Blueprint 2.1 ("The Watcher 2") (2003)
 Dino Soldo – Thread (2003)
 Biker Boyz (Motion Picture Film Score) (2003)
 WOW Gospel 2003 ("Beautiful" - Brent Jones & The TP Mobb)(2003)
 Dr. Dre featuring Knoc-turn'al: Bad Intentions - UK Release (2002)
 Jay Z – The Blueprint 2: The Gift & The Curse ("The Watcher 2") (2002)
 Brent Jones (musician) – Beautiful (2002)
 Lionel Richie – Don't Stop The Music (Europe Release CD/Maxi) (2001)
 Lionel Richie – Cinderella (Europe Release CD/Maxi) (2001)
 Hikaru Utada – Utada Hikaru Unplugged (Concert DVD/Live Album) (2001)
 Lucy Pearl – Lucy Pearl (2000)
 Lionel Richie – Renaissance (2000)
 Brent Jones (musician) – Brent Jones & The T.P. Mobb (2000)
 Lucy Pearl – Love & Basketball (Motion Picture Soundtrack) ("Dance Tonight") (2000)
 Dr. Dre – 2001 (1999)
 Dr. Dre – 2001 (Instrumentals Only) (1999)
 Cherokee – I Love You... Me (1999)
 Howard Cosell: Telling It Like It Is  – (HBO Documentary Film Score) (1999)
 Vesta Williams – Relationships (1998)
 The Temptations – Phoenix Rising (1998)
 Dawn Robinson – Dr. Dolittle: The Album (Motion Picture Soundtrack) (1998)
 The Tiger Woods Story (HBO Film Score) (1998)
 The Firm (hip hop group) – The Album (The Firm album) (1997)
 Tracie Spencer – Good Burger (Motion Picture Soundtrack) (1997)
 Sonny Liston The Mysterious Life and Death of a Champion (HBO Documentary Film Score) (1995)
 Malcolm X: Make It Plain'' (PBS Documentary Film Score) (1994)

Touring credits
Taku has been a percussionist on many tours since the late 1990s.

External links 
Official website

References

1972 births
Living people
Japanese percussionists
Jazz-funk percussionists
Afro-Cuban jazz percussionists
Latin jazz percussionists
Conga players
Japanese electronic musicians
Japanese session musicians
Japanese record producers
World music musicians
Musicians from Osaka
Musicians from Fresno, California
Berklee College of Music alumni
21st-century drummers
Ropeadope Records artists